On October 22, 1956, French forces hijacked a Moroccan civilian aircraft carrying leaders of the Algerian National Liberation Front (FLN) during the ongoing Algerian War. It was destined to leave from Palma de Mallorca for Tunis where the FLN leaders were to conference with Prime Minister Habib Bourguiba, but French forces intercepted the civilian aircraft over the Mediterranean Sea and redirected the flight to occupied Algiers, where the FLN leaders were arrested, derailing the planned conference in Tunis. It's considered one of the most important events in the Algerian War.

Context 
The French protectorate over Morocco had ended months before, and King Muhammad V supported the FLN in the struggle for Algerian independence.

Details 
On October 21, 1956, King Muhammad V of Morocco received a delegation of leaders of the Algerian National Liberation Front—Ahmed Ben Bella, Hocine Aït Ahmed, Mohamed Boudiaf, and Mohamed Khider—in Rabat. France disapproved of the meeting and Alain Savary, French Secretary of State for Tunisian and Moroccan Affairs under Guy Mollet, announced the suspension of aid to Morocco. 

October 22 at midday, with fake documents, the FLN delegation left Rabat for Tunis by way of Palma in Spain in order to avoid flying over Algeria to circumvent France. After departing Palma, French forces over the Mediterranean redirected the Moroccan aircraft and forced it to land in Algiers, where the FLN delegation was arrested.

The hijacking and arrest of the FLN leadership derailed the planned conference in Tunis, to have been attended by the FLN delegation as well as Habib Bourguiba and Muhammad V, with the goal of establishing a North African Federation to promote the independence of Algeria and end the French-Algerian war.

Aftermath 
King Muhammad V of Morocco was distraught and "feared for his own life." 

Anti-French riots broke out targeting French people in and around Meknes, with dozens of casualties.

Legacy 
Maati Monjib mentioned historians discussing the event as the first instance of a passenger aircraft hijacking in history, but it is not the case.

References 

Aircraft hijackings
National Liberation Front (Algeria)
Algerian War
France–Morocco relations
October 1956 events
1956 in Morocco
Algeria–Morocco relations